Bučić is a village situated in Merošina municipality, Nišava District in Serbia.

References

Populated places in Nišava District